Cliftonville is a coastal area of Margate in the Thanet district of Kent, England. It includes the Palm Bay estate, built in the 1930s with wide avenues and detached and semi-detached houses with driveways, garages and gardens.

East Cliftonville
The estate covers the eastern part of Cliftonville and was fields when first built. It extends east beyond Northumberland Avenue and has been developed in phases. An earlier phase covered the northern ends of Leicester and Gloucester Avenues and the whole of Clarence and Magnolia Avenues; the later phase extending eastwards of Princess Margaret Avenue is a Wimpy-style housing estate with small houses largely identical in appearance and of less substantial build quality than the original 1930s estate.

The eastward expansion of Cliftonville has included much of the former parish of Northdown including Northdown Park and House.

West Cliftonville
West Cliftonville was originally developed as an upmarket alternative to Margate and had many small private hotels and guest houses. Many of these have now been converted into Social Housing flats for the Roma community mainly coming from countries including: Czech Republic, Bulgaria and Slovakia. The seafront area once included a large Butlins complex.

Facilities
The shopping area of Cliftonville is called Northdown Road and includes a number of main banks and building societies, larger corporate concerns including Boots and Tesco, a number of family run specialist shops including an award-winning art gallery, a post office, several pubs and bars, many unique and upmarket coffee shops and cafes, two churches and a number of estate and letting agents as well as an award-winning media company all along its two-mile length.

Entertainment
Cliftonville also has an indoor ten-pin bowling alley and sports bar, tennis courts. The Oval Bandstand and Lawns is a significant part of Cliftonville's cultural landscape. The Oval Bandstand is a large capacity outdoor amphitheatre in Cliftonville and is open throughout the year. The Oval Lawns comprises over 4 acres of public amenity space owned and managed by not-for-profit GRASS Cliftonville CIC. This year the social enterprise will be hosting over 25 Summer Sunday community events, 4 outdoor cinemas, and will welcome over 15,000 visitors through the gates. The famous Winter Gardens theatre. Faith In Strangers also exists in Cliftonville Faith in Strangers A 350 capacity venue, bar, workspace and soon to be restaurant, open to all. Margate Arts Club is an small venue with membership for the artistic crowd of Cliftonville.

Writing and poetry
During the first half of the 20th century Cliftonville was considered the fashionable hotel quarter of Margate. It was during the autumn of 1921 that T.S. Eliot spent a period of convalescence at the Albemarle Hotel, Cliftonville. His widow has confirmed that he found inspiration for, and wrote significant sections of The Waste Land in the Grade II-listed Nayland Rock promenade shelter.

The spirit of early 20th century Cliftonville was caught by John Betjeman in his poem "Margate Pier".

Notable people
The stage and film actor Trevor Howard was born in Cliftonville in 1913.

See also
 Botany Bay, Kent
 Shell Grotto, Margate

References

External links

 Open Directory Project

Populated coastal places in Kent